Joseph Maria Pernicone (November 4, 1903 – February 11, 1985) was an American clergyman of the Roman Catholic Church. He served as an auxiliary bishop of the Archdiocese of New York from 1954 to 1978.

Biography

Joseph Pernicone was born in Regalbuto, Sicily, to Salvatore and Petronilla (née Taverna) Pernicone. He received his early training at the seminaries in Nicosia and Catania. He came to the United States in 1920. He continued his studies at Cathedral College in New York City and St. Joseph's Seminary in Yonkers.

He was ordained to the priesthood on December 18, 1926. His first assignment was as a curate at Our Lady of Mount Carmel Church in Yonkers. In 1932, he earned a Doctor of Canon Law degree from the Catholic University of America in Washington, D.C. He was pastor of Our Lady of Mount Carmel's Church (Poughkeepsie, New York) from 1932 to 1944, and served as master of ceremonies at the Requiem Mass for Marchese Guglielmo Marconi, the inventor of wireless telegraphy, in 1937.

From 1944 to 1966, he was pastor of Our Lady of Mount Carmel Church in the Bronx. During his tenure in the Bronx, he oversaw the construction of a parochial school which opened in 1949. He was named a papal chamberlain in 1945, and raised to the rank of domestic prelate in 1952.

On April 6, 1954, Pernicone was appointed auxiliary bishop of the New York and titular bishop of Hadrianopolis in Honoriade by Pope Pius XII. He received his episcopal consecration on the following May 5 from Cardinal Francis Spellman, with Bishops Joseph Francis Flannelly and Edward Vincent Dargin serving as co-consecrators, at St. Patrick's Cathedral. During his tenure as an auxiliary bishop, he also served as pastor of Holy Trinity Church in Poughkeepsie and episcopal vicar of Dutchess and Putnam Counties. After reaching the mandatory retirement age of 75, he retired as auxiliary bishop on November 28, 1978.

He died from a stroke at Jacobi Hospital in the Bronx, aged 81.

References

1903 births
1985 deaths
Religious leaders from the Province of Enna
Italian emigrants to the United States
Saint Joseph's Seminary (Dunwoodie) alumni
Catholic University of America alumni
20th-century American Roman Catholic titular bishops
Participants in the Second Vatican Council
Clergy from Sicily
People from Regalbuto